"Flesh for Fantasy" is a song by Billy Idol from his 1983 studio album Rebel Yell. It became the album's third single.

Background and writing 
The song was written by Billy Idol and Steve Stevens, with its title being inspired by the 1943 American film Flesh and Fantasy.

Charts

References

External links 
 "Flesh for Fantasy" at Discogs

1984 singles
Songs written by Billy Idol
Billy Idol songs
Song recordings produced by Keith Forsey
Chrysalis Records singles